Arkansas Register of Historic Places (ARHPs) are sites, structures, buildings, landscaped areas and objects in the state of Arkansas that have been determined to have statewide architectural, cultural or historical significance.

Administration
The Arkansas Historic Preservation Program (AHPP) nominates properties for inclusion in the ARHP; completing a nomination often started by the property owner or a local community and submitting it to an eleven-member selection board who reviews the submittals and makes a recommendation on the property's inclusion. The selection board consists of appointees serving at the pleasure of the Governor of Arkansas.

Criteria
Structures of sound design, construction, feeling and association which are usually at least 50 years old are compared against the following criteria for inclusion on the register:

 Association with events of state or local historical significance
 Association with the lives of persons of significance in the history of the state or locality
 Represent a type, style or period of architecture
 Association with important elements of Arkansas's history or pre-history

See also
 

 National Historic Sites (United States)
 National Register of Historic Places listings in Arkansas, with links to list articles by county

References

External links
Encyclopedia of Arkansas History & Culture entry

Heritage registers in the United States
History of Arkansas